Egerton House Hotel is an AA five star double-townhouse hotel located at 17-19 Egerton Terrace off Brompton Road in the Knightsbridge area of London.  It is part of the Red Carnation Hotels group. The hotel consists of two adjoining Victorian townhouses constructed from red-brick, which were originally built in 1843. It is managed by Michelle Devlin and Annie McCrann. The hotel has 28 en-suite rooms and a number of suites. The hotel is consistently rated within the top 10 best reviewed hotels within London on Tripadvisor.com

Art
The hotel contains a number of original lithographs, by French artist Henri de Toulouse-Lautrec and original works by Picasso and Matisse which belong to the personal collection of the president and founder Mrs. Beatrice Tollman.

Reception
The hotel featured in travel magazine Condé Nast Traveller's annual Gold List of 'best places in the world to stay' in January 2011 and Voted "Most Excellent City Hotel in the UK 2012" by Condenast Johansens

References

External links 
 Official website
Review of The Egerton House Hotel on Tripadvisor

Hotels in London